The 1929 Lafayette Leopards football team was an American football team that represented Lafayette College in the Middle Three Conference during the 1929 college football season. In its sixth season under head coach Herb McCracken, the team compiled a 3–5 record. William Sherwood was the team captain.

Schedule

References

Lafayette
Lafayette Leopards football seasons
Lafayette Leopards football